DXOO (97.5 FM) is a radio station owned by Nation Broadcasting Corporation and operated by TV5 Network, Inc., serving as a relay station of Radyo5 in Manila. The station's transmitter is located in PLDT Building, Beatiles St., General Santos.

History
The station began operations in 1976 as MRS 97.5, airing an adult contemporary format. In 1998, after NBC was acquired by PLDT subsidiary MediaQuest Holdings, the station rebranded as Anna @ Rhythms 97.5 (later on shortened to Anna 97.5) and switched to a Top 40 format. In 2009, it rebranded as WAV FM. On February 21, 2011, months after TV5 took over operations of the stations, it became a relay station of 92.3 Radyo5 TRUE FM in Manila.

References

Radio stations in General Santos
Radio stations established in 1976